Irom Chanu Sharmila (born 14 March 1972), also known as the "Iron Lady of Manipur" or "Mengoubi" ("the fair one") is an Indian civil rights activist, political activist, and poet from the Indian state of Manipur, which is located on the north-eastern side of India. On 5 November 2000, she began a hunger strike in favour of abolishing the Armed Forces (Special Powers) Act, 1958 that applies to the seven states and grants Indian armed forces the power to search properties without a warrant, and to arrest people, and to use deadly force if there is "reasonable suspicion" that a person is acting against the state. She ended the fast on 9 August 2016, after 16 long years of fasting. Having refused food and water for more than 500 weeks (she was nasally force fed in jail), she has been called "the world's longest hunger striker". On International Women's Day, 2014 she was voted the top woman icon of India by MSN Poll.

In 2014 two parties asked her to stand in the national election, but she declined. She was then denied the right to vote as a person confined in jail cannot vote according to law. On 19 August 2014 a court ordered her release from custody, subject to there being no other grounds for detention. She was re-arrested on 22 August 2014 on similar charges to those for which she was acquitted, and remanded in judicial custody for 15 days. Amnesty International has declared her as a prisoner of conscience.

Background
Sharmila grew up and lives in Manipur, one of the Seven Sister States in India's northeast, which has suffered from an insurgency for decades; from 2005 to 2015 about 5,500 people died from political violence. In 1958, the Indian government passed a law, the Armed Forces (Special Powers) Act, 1958 that applies to just the seven states and grants security forces the power to search properties without a warrant, and to arrest people, and to use deadly force if there is "reasonable suspicion" that a person is acting against the state; a similar Act applies to Jammu and Kashmir.

She was already involved in local peace movements with regard to human rights abuses in Manipur when, on 2 November 2000, in Malom, a town in the Imphal Valley of Manipur, ten civilians were shot and killed while waiting at a bus stop. The incident, known as the "Malom Massacre", was allegedly committed by the Assam Rifles, one of the Indian Paramilitary forces operating in the state. The victims included Leisangbam Ibetombi, a 62-year-old woman, and 18-year-old Sinam Chandramani, a 1998 National Bravery Award winner.

The fast and responses
Sharmila, who was 28 at the time of Malom Massacre, began to fast in protest. Her primary demand to the Indian government has been the repeal of the Armed Forces (Special Powers) Act (AFSPA). She began her fast in Malom on 5 November, and vowed not to eat, drink, comb her hair or look in a mirror until AFSPA was repealed.

Three days after she began her strike, she was arrested by the police and charged with an "attempt to commit suicide", which was unlawful under the Indian Penal Code (IPC) at that time, and was later transferred to judicial custody. Her health deteriorated rapidly, and nasogastric intubation was forced on her from 21 November in order to keep her alive while under arrest.

Sharmila has been regularly released and re-arrested every year since her hunger strike began.

By 2004, Sharmila had become an "icon of public resistance." Following her procedural release on 2 October 2006 Sharmila went to Raj Ghat, New Delhi, which she said was "to pay floral tribute to my ideal, Mahatma Gandhi." Later that evening, Sharmila headed for Jantar Mantar for a protest demonstration where she was joined by students, human rights activists and other concerned citizens.
On 6 October, she was re-arrested by the Delhi police for attempting suicide and was taken to the All India Institute of Medical Sciences, where she wrote letters to the Prime Minister, the President, and the Home Minister. At this time, she met and won the support of Nobel-laureate Shirin Ebadi, the Nobel Laureate and human rights activist, who promised to take up Sharmila's cause at the United Nations Human Rights Council.

In 2011, she invited anti-corruption activist Anna Hazare to visit Manipur, and Hazare sent two representatives to meet with her.

In September 2011, Communist Party of India (Marxist–Leninist) (CPI ML) openly stated its support for her and for repeal of AFSPA, calling for nationwide agitation.

Following that in October 2011, the Manipur Pradesh All India Trinamool Congress announced their support for Sharmila and called on party chief Mamata Banerjee to help repeal the AFSPA. Then in November, at the end of the eleventh year of her fast, Sharmila again called on Prime Minister Manmohan Singh to repeal the law. On 3 November 100 women formed a human chain in Ambari to show support for Sharmila, while other civil society groups staged a 24-hour fast in a show of solidarity.

In 2011 the Save Sharmila Solidarity Campaign (SSSC) was launched to highlight Sharmila's struggle and in December 2011, Pune University announced a scholarship program for 39 female Manipuri students to take degree courses in honour of Irom Sharmila Chanu's 39 years of age.

She only met her mother once during the fast, as she believed that seeing her mother's anguish might have broken her resolve. She said "The day AFSPA is repealed I will eat rice from my mother's hand."

On 28 March 2016, she was released from judicial custody as charges against her were rejected by a local court in Imphal. Sharmila kept her vow of neither entering her house nor meeting her mother until the government repeals AFSPA and went to continue her fast at Shahid Minar, Imphal on the same day of her release. She was again arrested by the police under the same charge of attempt to commit suicide by means of indefinite fast.

End of the fast
On 26 July 2016, Irom Sharmila( Iron lady of Manipur), who had been on a hunger strike since 2000, announced that she would end her fast on 9 August 2017. She also announced that she would contest the next state elections in Manipur.

The objective of her fast and entering politics is to fight for the removal of AFSPA as she has asserted "I will join politics and my fight will continue."

International attention
Sharmila was awarded the 2007 Gwangju Prize for Human Rights, which is given to "an outstanding person or group, active in the promotion and advocacy of Peace, Democracy and Human Rights". She shared the award with Lenin Raghuvanshi of People's Vigilance Committee on Human Rights, a northeastern Indian human rights organisation.

In 2009, she was awarded the first Mayilamma Award of the Mayilamma Foundation "for achievement of her nonviolent struggle in Manipur".

In 2010, she won a lifetime achievement award from the Asian Human Rights Commission. Later that year, she won the Rabindranath Tagore Peace Prize of the Indian Institute of Planning and Management, which came with a cash award of 5,100,000 rupees, and the Sarva Gunah Sampannah "Award for Peace and Harmony" from the Signature Training Centre.

In 2013, Amnesty International declared her a Prisoner of conscience, and said she "is being held solely for a peaceful expression of her beliefs." The influence made by Irom Sharmila is often considered as powerful as the influences by personalities in the past and present.

Subsequent work
In October 2016, she launched a political party named Peoples' Resurgence and Justice Alliance to contest two Assembly constituencies of Khurai and Khangabok. Khangabok is the home constituency of Chief Minister Okram Ibobi Singh. In the 2017 Manipur Legislative Assembly election, the winner in Thoubal, Ibobi Singh, received 18,649 and Sharmila received 90 votes; the fewest of the five candidates.

In 2019, after the death of Gauri Lankesh, Sharmila criticized the NDA government, accusing it of disregarding people's sentiments when making policy decisions. In an interview with The Economic Times, she mentioned that she was no more interested in politics as she already experienced electoral politics and the dirtiness involved in the process.

After the MHA tweeted removal of the AFSPA from swathes of the North East the Chief Minister of Manipur called for a day of celebration to which he would invite Irom Sharmila as a guest.

In popular culture
Deepti Priya Mehrotra's Burning Bright: Irom Sharmila and the Struggle for Peace in Manipur details Sharmila's life and the political background of her fast.
IronIrom: Two Journeys : Where the Abnormal is Normal (2012, with Minnie Vaid and Tayenjam Bijoykumar Singh)

Ojas S V, a theater artist from Pune, performed a mono-play titled Le Mashale ("Take the Torch"), based on Irom Sharmila's life and struggle.  It is an adaptation of Meira Paibi (Women bearing torches), a drama written by Malayalam playwright Civic Chandran. The play was performed at several venues in several Indian states.

Personal life
On Thursday 17 August 2017, Irom Sharmila Chanu married her British partner Desmond Anthony Bellarnine Coutinho in Kodaikanal, a hill station in Tamil Nadu. On Sunday 12 May 2019, at the age of 47, she gave birth to twin daughters in Bengaluru, Karnataka, named Nix Shakhi and Autumn Tara.

See also
 Indian general election, 2014 (Manipur)
 Insurgency in Manipur
 Armed Forces (Special Powers) Act

Bibliography
 Fragrance of Peace (2010)
 IronIrom: Two Journeys: Where the abnormal is normal.

References

External links

 Analysis of Sharmila's poetry
 Save Sharmila Solidarity Campaign
 Amnesty International USA's campaign page 

1972 births
Indian activist journalists
Indian civil rights activists
Indian women activists
Living people
Meitei people
Nonviolence advocates
Political repression in India
Writers from Northeast India
Hunger strikers
People from Imphal
Indian women journalists
21st-century Indian journalists
Indian prisoners and detainees
Amnesty International prisoners of conscience held by India
Women writers from Manipur
Activists from Manipur
Journalists from Manipur
21st-century Indian women writers
21st-century Indian poets
Poets from Manipur
Women civil rights activists